Senator Reynolds may refer to:

Members of the United States Senate
Robert Rice Reynolds (1884–1963), U.S. senator from North Carolina from 1932 and 1945
Samuel W. Reynolds (1890–1988), U.S. senator from Nebraska in 1954

United States state senate members
Benoni Reynolds (1824–1911), Wisconsin State Senate
Daniel H. Reynolds (1832–1902), Arkansas State Senate
Deborah Reynolds (fl. 2000s–2010s), New Hampshire State Senate
Edward Reynolds (American politician) (1856–1938), Maine State Senate
Hubert Reynolds (1860–1938), Colorado State Senate
Hugh Reynolds (fl. 1860s–1870s), Wisconsin State Senate
James C. Reynolds (1849–1933), Wisconsin State Senate
John F. Reynolds (politician) (1852–1934), Wisconsin State Senate
Kim Reynolds (born 1959), Iowa State Senate
Roscoe Reynolds (born 1942), Virginia State Senate
Thomas G. Reynolds (born 1956), Wisconsin State Senate